2019 Loralai attack took place on 29 January 2019 in Loralai, Balochistan, Pakistan. Nine people (eight policemen and a civilian) were killed while 22 others were injured when gunmen and suicide bombers attacked a Deputy Inspector General's (DIG) office. The Tehrik-i-Taliban Pakistan claimed responsibility for the attack.

The Pashtun Tahafuz Movement protested against the attack and held sit-ins in Balochistan's Quetta and Loralai. However, when the police launched a crackdown against the nonviolent protesters, Arman Loni, one of the leaders of PTM, was killed in Loralai.

Another attack occurred in Loralai on 16 February 2019.

See also
 2019 Ghotki riots
 2014 Larkana temple attack
 2009 Gojra riots

References

2019 in Balochistan, Pakistan
2019 mass shootings in Asia
2019 murders in Pakistan 
2010s crimes in Balochistan, Pakistan
21st-century mass murder in Pakistan
Attacks on buildings and structures in 2019 
Attacks on buildings and structures in Balochistan, Pakistan
Islamic terrorist incidents in 2019
January 2019 crimes in Asia
January 2019 events in Pakistan
January 2019 attack
Mass murder in 2019
Mass murder in Balochistan, Pakistan
Mass shootings in Pakistan 
Suicide bombings in 2019
Suicide bombings in Balochistan, Pakistan
Tehrik-i-Taliban Pakistan attacks
Terrorist incidents in Pakistan in 2019
Deaths by firearm in Balochistan, Pakistan